Miska Ylitolva (born 23 May 2004) is a Finnish international footballer who plays for HJK in Veikkausliiga as a right back.

Club career 

Ylitolva began playing football at age 10 for Rovaniemi side FC Santa Claus. Later he joined another local club RoPS where he made his senior debut in 2020 at age 16 playing for their reserve team in third tier Kakkonen. In 2021 he was promoted to the RoPS first team playing in second tier Ykkönen.

In January 2022 Ylitolva signed a two-year contract with Veikkausliiga side HJK. He made his Veikkausliiga debut on 2 April 2022 against Honka. On 9 May 2022, Ylitolva signed an updated contract until the end of 2024 season.

International career 
Ylitolva made his international debut on senior level for Finland on 26 March 2022 in a friendly match against Iceland. He has also played for Finland on U16 and U18 levels.

References

External links

2004 births
Living people
Finnish footballers
Finland youth international footballers
Finland international footballers
Association football defenders
Footballers from Espoo
Helsingin Jalkapalloklubi players